Isochariesthes arrowi is a species of beetle in the family Cerambycidae. It was described by Stephan von Breuning in 1934.

Subspecies
 Isochariesthes arrowi arrowi (Breuning, 1934)
 Isochariesthes arrowi murphyi (Téocchi, 1989)

References

arrowi
Beetles described in 1934